The Journal of Neurotrauma is a monthly peer-reviewed medical journal covering research on neurotraumas. It is an official journal of the National Neurotrauma Society and the International Neurotrauma Society. The journal was established in 1984 and is published by Mary Ann Liebert, Inc. The editor-in-chief is David L. Brody, MD, PhD.

Journal of Neurotrauma reports the latest advances in both the clinical and laboratory investigation of traumatic brain and spinal cord injury. The Journal focuses on the basic pathobiology of injury to the central nervous system, while considering preclinical and clinical trials targeted at improving both the early management and long-term care and recovery of traumatically injured patients. 

Journal of Neurotrauma coverage includes:

 Neuronal injury from a cellular to molecular perspective
 Neurochemical alterations and behavioral abnormalities
 Electrophysiological change
 Stem cell biology and transplantation
 Neurorehabilitation

Abstracting and indexing
The journal is abstracted and indexed in:

According to the Journal Citation Reports, the journal has a 2020 impact factor of 5.269.

References

External links

Neurology journals
Mary Ann Liebert academic journals
Publications established in 1984
English-language journals
Biweekly journals
Academic journals associated with learned and professional societies